Medio Baudó is a municipality and town in the Chocó Department, Colombia.

Climate
Medio Baudó has an extremely wet tropical rainforest climate (Af) with very heavy to extremely heavy rainfall year-round. The following climate data is for the town of Boca de Pepé, the capital of the municipality.

References

Municipalities of Chocó Department